Secrets from the Sky is a British television programme presented by historian Bettany Hughes and archaeologist Ben Robinson that was shown by ITV and first aired in October 2014.

The premise of the series was to explore some of Britain's most historic landmarks as seen from the air. Robinson used an Octocopter drone to capture the aerial footage.

List of episodes

References

2014 British television series debuts
2014 British television series endings
2010s British documentary television series
English-language television shows
Archaeology of the United Kingdom
ITV documentaries